David Cooper (born November 2, 1973) is a Canadian former professional ice hockey defenceman.  He was drafted in the first round, 11th overall, by the Buffalo Sabres in the 1992 NHL Entry Draft.

He received WHL East First All-Star Team award in 1992.

Playing career
As a youth, Cooper played in the 1987 Quebec International Pee-Wee Hockey Tournament with the Winnipeg South Monarchs minor ice hockey team.

After playing four seasons in the Western Hockey League with the Medicine Hat Tigers, Cooper made his professional debut with Buffalo's American Hockey League affiliate, the Rochester Americans, in the 1993 Calder Cup Playoffs. Cooper then played three full seasons with the Sabres' organization, with the Americans as well as the team's ECHL affiliate, the South Carolina Stingrays.

Cooper made his National Hockey League debut with the Toronto Maple Leafs during the 1996–97 season, appearing in 19 games and scoring three goals. Cooper would play nine more games with Toronto in 1997–98 and two more in 2000–01, giving him a total of 30 games played in the NHL.

In his brief NHL career, Cooper scored three goals and added seven assists.

Cooper also played in Germany's Deutsche Eishockey Liga, the Russian Hockey Super League, the Danish Oddset Ligaen and Italy's Serie A before retiring from the game.

Career statistics

Awards
 WHL East First All-Star Team – 1992

References

External links

1973 births
Living people
Asiago Hockey 1935 players
Buffalo Sabres draft picks
Canadian expatriate ice hockey players in Denmark
Canadian expatriate ice hockey players in Italy
Canadian expatriate ice hockey players in Germany
Canadian expatriate ice hockey players in Russia
Canadian ice hockey defencemen
Eisbären Berlin players
HC Alleghe players
Ice hockey people from Ottawa
Iserlohn Roosters players
Kassel Huskies players
Medicine Hat Tigers players
National Hockey League first-round draft picks
Rochester Americans players
Rødovre Mighty Bulls players
Saint John Flames players
St. John's Maple Leafs players
SG Pontebba players
SKA Saint Petersburg players
South Carolina Stingrays players
Toronto Maple Leafs players